The extensor medii proprius (so called the extensor digiti medii) is a rare anatomical variant in the extensor compartment of the forearm. The aberrant muscle is analogous to the extensor indicis with the insertion being the middle finger instead of the index finger.

Structure 
The extensor medii proprius originates from the distal third of ulna near the extensor indicis and the adjacent interosseous membrane. It passes through the fourth extensor compartment along with the extensor indicis and the extensor digitorum. It inserts to the extensor expansion of the middle finger usually on the ulnar side of the tendon of the extensor digitorum of the middle finger, though, insertion deep to the extensor digirorum tendon was seen. Insertion to the fibrous tissue proximal to the metacarpophalangeal joint of the middle finger was also reported.

Prevalence 
The reported incidence of the extensor medii proprius in cadaveric dissections ranges from 0% to 12%. Meta-analysis showed that the prevalence of this muscle was significantly higher in North American and Japanese populations than European and Indian populations.

Function
The extensor medii proprius extends the middle finger. The presence of this anomalous muscle results in a more independent movement of the middle finger.

Clinical significance
The extensor medii proprius is unlikely to cause symptoms. However, awareness of this anomalous muscle may help physicians for identification and for proper planning of surgery.

Additional Images

See also
 Extensor digitorum
 Extensor indicis
 Extensor indicis et medii communis
 List of anatomical variations

References

External links
 

Muscles of the upper limb
Anatomical variations